is a Japanese professional shogi player, ranked 9-dan. He is a former Ōi title holder. He is also the oldest player to win a major title for the first time.

Early life, amateur shogi and apprenticeship
Kimura was born in Yotsukaidō, Chiba Prefecture on June 23, 1973. He learned how to play shogi at a friend's house when he was in kindergarten, and started regularly going to a local shogi club when he was a second-grade elementary school student.

Kimura first met his future mentor shogi professional  when the two played a 2-piece handicap game. Kimura soon began taking lessons from Sase at his house, where he occasionally played practice games against Hiroe Nakai, who was another one of Sase's students.

At first, Kimura progressed fairly quickly and was promoted to the rank of 3-dan in the fall of 1990 when he was an eleventh-grade high school student, but it took more than six years before he was able to obtain professional status and the rank of 4-dan in April 1997.

Shogi professional
In June 2019, Kimura defeated Yoshiharu Habu to earn the right to challenge Masayuki Toyoshima for the 60th Ōi title. In the title match against Toyoshima, Kimura lost the first two games before coming back to tie the score at two wins apiece. Toyoshima won Game 5 and needed just one more win to defend his title; Kimura, however, won the last two games to win the match 4 games to 3. The victory not only gave Kimura his first major title, but it also made him the oldest first time winner of a major title at the age of 46 years and 3 months, breaking the record of 37 years and 6 months set by Michio Ariyoshi in 1973.

In JuneAugust 2020, Kimura was unable to defend his Ōi title against Sōta Fujii, losing the 61st Ōi title match 4 games to none.

In SeptemberOctober 2021, Kimura challenged Takuya Nagase for the 69th Ōza title, but lost the match 3 games to 1.

Promotion history
The promotion history  for Kimura is as follows:
 6-kyū: 1985
 1-dan: 1988
 4-dan: April 1, 1997
 5-dan: April 1, 1999
 6-dan: December 17, 2001
 7-dan: April 1, 2003
 8-dan: April 1, 2007
 9-dan: June 26, 2017

Titles and other championships
Kimura has appeared in a major title match nine times, and has won one title; he has also won two non-major-title championships during his career.

Awards and honors
Kimura has received a number of Japan Shogi Association Annual Shogi Awards throughout his career. He won the ""Best New Player" award for 19971998; the "Best Winning Percentage" award for 19981999; the "Best Winning Percentage", "Most Games Won" and  "Most games Played" awards for 20002001; the "Fighting-spirit" award for  20082009; and, the “Special Award” for 2019.

Year-end prize money and game fee ranking
Kimura has finished in the "Top 10" of the JSA's  nine times since turning professional.

Note: All amounts are given in Japanese yen and include prize money and fees earned from official tournaments and games held from January 1 to December 31.

References

External links
ShogiHub: Professional Player Info · Kimura, Kazuki

1973 births
Japanese shogi players
Living people
People from Yotsukaidō
Professional shogi players
Professional shogi players from Chiba Prefecture
Ōi (shogi)
Shinjin-Ō